The 2010–11 Biathlon World Cup - World Cup 5 was held in Ruhpolding, Germany, from 12 January until 16 January 2011.

Schedule of events 
The time schedule of the event stands below

Medal winners

Men

Women

Achievements

 Best performance for all time

 , 67th place in Individual
 , 10th place in Sprint
 , 23rd place in Sprint
 , 30th place in Sprint
 , 34th place in Sprint
 , 85th place in Sprint
 , 92nd place in Sprint
 , 18th place in Individual
 , 49th place in Individual and 40th place in Sprint
 , 50th place in Individual
 , 68th place in Individual
 , 71st place in Individual
 , 24th place in Sprint
 , 35th place in Sprint
 , 46th place in Sprint
 , 49th place in Sprint and 46th place in Pursuit
 , 58th place in Sprint

 First World Cup race

 , 51st place in Individual
 , 88th place in Individual
 , 91st place in Individual
 , 96th place in Sprint
 , 81st place in Sprint
 , 88th place in Sprint

References 

- World Cup 5, 2010-11 Biathlon World Cup
Biathlon World Cup - World Cup 5, 2010-11
January 2011 sports events in Europe
2010s in Bavaria
Biathlon competitions in Germany
Sports competitions in Bavaria